The Hotel Reichshof was opened in 1910 as a Hamburger traditional hotel in the classical patrician style. It was a four-star hotel by the end of May 2014, when the Hotel Reichshof was closed. On 17 July 2015 after extensive renovations it was re-opened under a new name and management - Reichshof Hamburg, Curio Collection by Hilton. Subsequently, on 27 July 2021, the hotel left the Curio Collection by Hilton and continued operating as an independent hotel.

Location

The hotel is located in the center of Hamburg city center, opposite the main railway station, close to the Deutsches Schauspielhaus.

Amenities & Features
By 2014 the hotel had six floors with 303 rooms, including two suites with 45 square meters and a "themed room St. Pauli", with a total of 465 beds. It was equipped with swimming pool, sauna and steam room. There were also 14 meeting and banquet rooms with modern conference technology for up to 400 people.
After the reopening in 2015, the hotel has 278 guest rooms, 6 junior suites and 3 One-Bedroom Suites, 10 conference and meeting rooms and a modern spa and fitness area.

Gastronomy

The heart of the hotel is the "Restaurant Classic" with elegant wood paneling and a revolving gallery. It is set up like a restaurant on a cruise ship and the dining room was designed by the ship outfitters Friese in the style of a luxury liner. 
However the real showpiece is the bar, which was built in the 1920s in the Art Deco style and carefully restored in the course of reopening in 2015.

History

The first stone for the building complex was laid in 1906. The plot was then still on uncultivated ground, opposite the main railway station, which was the only completed development there. The Founder and builder of the hotel was Anton Emil Langer (1864-1928), former executive chef of the Ocean-Liners of the shipping company the HAPAG. The family already owned the hotel "Esplanade" and 27 more hotels.
After the death of Anton Emil Langer his wife Martha and son Herbert Emil ran the house, later his wife died. They still live in the family estate on the river Elbe.

The building

The construction was designed by the architect Heinrich Mandix, in the reform style with baroque and classical appeal. At the opening in 1910 it was one of the largest hotels in Europe and at that time was the largest hotel in Germany. It was named in honor of Kaiser Wilhelm II. With running water, electricity and telephone connections in every room, it had one of the most high-tech equipment for that time. Pioneering technology were also the car garage and the hydraulic lifts.

The building was destroyed partially during World War II and now is a listed building. A lot of the old-style elements are preserved in the original.

Gallery

References

Hotels in Germany
Hilton Hotels & Resorts hotels
Hotels established in 1910
Hotel buildings completed in 1910
Tourism in Hamburg